Playmates Toys Limited is a Hong Kong toy company. The company was founded in Hong Kong in 1966 by Sam Chan as Playmates Industrial, manufacturing dolls for other companies. In 1975, Playmates began marketing their own line of pre-school toys, and in 1977 opened an American subsidiary in Boston. Another subsidiary was founded in California in 1983; in 1984 the company went public.

The company's first big success was in 1986, with the marketing of a tape-playing, electronic robot doll named Cricket. In 1989, the company marketed Teenage Mutant Ninja Turtles action figures which sold extremely well.

Proprietary brands 

 Amazing Dolls
 Amazing Pets
 Hearts For Hearts Girls
 Kinder-Garden Babies
 Nano Pets
 R.E.V.s
 Waterbabies
 WOW Pals
 Yo Stick
 Struts
 Ooglies
 Kuroba
 Tiny Toes
 BFF Best Friends Forever
 The Addams Family
 Austin Powers Vocalizaers

Tie-in media toys 
Playmates Toys has often been under contract as a chosen third-party to produce toys, fashion dolls, games, and other merchandise coinciding with popular film and television media. Examples of media that Playmates has done toys for include Atomic Betty, Teenage Mutant Ninja Turtles, Star Trek, Ben 10, Godzilla vs. Kong, the Disney movie franchise Frozen, Miraculous Ladybug, Pikwik Pack, and others. They were made in cooperation with various international media production companies, including Canadian company Nelvana and United States companies Disney, DreamWorks Animation, and Nickelodeon.

Playmates Interactive 
Playmates Interactive Entertainment Inc. was founded as a subsidiary of Playmates Toys Holdings which is the parent company of Playmates Toys in 1994. It is co-located with the United States branch of Playmates Toys in La Mirada, California. In September 1996, Playmates Toys' US branch and Playmates Interactive relocated their headquarters, including 50 employees to Costa Mesa, California. At the same time, Gary Rosenfeld and Chris Archer joined the company as vice-president of business affairs and producer, respectively. In August 1997, Playmates Interactive's president, Richard Sallis, resigned and was succeeded by Ron Welch. Playmates Interactive was defunct by May 2000.

References

External links 
 

 
Companies listed on the Hong Kong Stock Exchange
Companies of Hong Kong
Toy brands
Toy companies established in 1966